Murod Kholmukhamedov (born 23 December 1990) is an Uzbek footballer who currently plays as a defender for Kokand 1912 in the Uzbekistan Super League. He is also a member of the Uzbekistan national team.

International goals
Scores and results list Uzbekistan's goal tally first.

Honours
Pakhtakor Tashkent
Uzbek League: 2012, 2014, 2015
Uzbekistan Cup: 2009, 2011

References

External links

1990 births
Living people
Sportspeople from Tashkent
Uzbekistani footballers
Uzbekistan international footballers
Uzbekistani expatriate footballers
Pakhtakor Tashkent FK players
FC Sogdiana Jizzakh players
FC Bunyodkor players
Chinese Super League players
Uzbekistan Super League players
Expatriate footballers in China
Uzbekistani expatriate sportspeople in China
Association football defenders